Sagafilm is an Icelandic production company for TV, commercials and feature films. It was founded in 1978 and is the oldest film production company in Iceland.

Documentaries
Out of Thin Air (2017)
Raise the bar (2021)

Films
Fish out of water
Cold Trail (2006)
Bjarnfreðarson (2009)
Dead Snow 2: Red vs. Dead
The Falcons (2017)

TV shows
Svartir Englar (2008)
The Press (2008-2011)
Næturvaktin (2007)
Dagvaktin (2008)
Fangavaktin (2009)
The Court (2010-2011)
World's End (2011)
Case (2015)
Stella Blómkvist (2017-2021)
The Flatey Enigma (2018)
The Minister (2020)
Thin Ice (2020)

References

External links
Official website

Film production companies of Iceland